Graham's Forge Mill is a historic grist mill located in the community of Grahams Forge, Wythe County, Virginia. The mill was built about 1890, and is a five-story, rectangular, wood-frame building on a limestone foundation. Atop the cross-gable standing seam metal roof is a cupola with a finial, decorative cresting on the ridges, and a late-Victorian-styled lightning rod.  Also on the property are the contributing smokehouse with oven / kettle used for hog scalding, corn crib, grain storage facility, oven / kettle remains, and mill dam.

It was listed on the National Register of Historic Places in 2005.

References

Grinding mills in Virginia
Grinding mills on the National Register of Historic Places in Virginia
Victorian architecture in Virginia
Industrial buildings completed in 1890
Buildings and structures in Wythe County, Virginia
National Register of Historic Places in Wythe County, Virginia